Alwyn Williams is a Jamaican cricketer. He made his first-class debut for Jamaica in the 2018–19 Regional Four Day Competition on 28 February 2019. In June 2020, he was selected by Jamaica, in the players' draft hosted by Cricket West Indies ahead of the 2020–21 domestic season.

References

External links
 

Year of birth missing (living people)
Living people
Jamaican cricketers
Jamaica cricketers
Place of birth missing (living people)